Lake Vermilion is a 1,000-acre (4.0 km2) reservoir located in Vermilion County, Illinois.  It was built for water supply, fishing, and recreation purposes.  The lake is 3 miles (4.8 km) long and 0.5 miles (0.8 km) wide.  The nearest city is Danville, in eastern Illinois.

Lake Vermilion is managed by the Vermilion County Conservation District (VCCD) for bass, catfish, and crappie.  The nearest interstate highway exit is Exit 215 on Interstate 74, near Danville.

The lake is owned by Aqua Illinois, a subsidiary of Aqua America.  The rules of the lake allow unlimited-horsepower marine boating, jetskiing, and waterskiing.  Boat decals are required.

Fishing 
Lake Vermilion contains the following species:
 Bluegill
 Carp
 Channel catfish
 Largemouth bass
 White crappie
 White bass
 Yellow bass
 Yellow bullhead

References

External links
Vermilion County site

Vermilion
Protected areas of Vermilion County, Illinois
Bodies of water of Vermilion County, Illinois